Ruzen Atakan (born 1966) in Akincilar is a Turkish-Cypriot painter and the daughter of a school teacher Kemal Atakan. She graduated from Gazi University Turkey, in 1988. She has had three solo shows and took part in mixed and group exhibitions in Cyprus as well as overseas. She teaches at Fine Arts Secondary School, Nicosia, Cyprus.

Exhibitions 
Ruzen participated in the following exhibitions:
 1988  Group Exhibition in British Council, Ankara.
 1990  Group Exhibition at Fluxus Art Gallery, Nicosia.
 1991  1st Solo Exhibition at Fluxus Art Gallery, Nicosia.
 1991  Contemporary Turkish Cypriot Painting Exhibition, London.
 1994  2nd Solo Exhibition at Atatürk Cultural Center, Nicosia.
 1994  Namık Kemal Painting Prize, Famagusta.
 1997  3rd Solo Exhibition Atatürk Cultural Center, Nicosia.
 1977  State Art and Sculpture Prize, Nicosia.
 1999  Group Exhibition at Gotland University College, Gotland,
 1999  Namık Kemal Painting Prize, Famagusta.
 1999  Group Exhibition at Kunstmesse, Salzburg,
 2001  Group Exhibition at IMKB, Istanbul.
 2003  Bi-communal Exhibition at Hilton Hotel, Nicosia.
 2003  Group Exhibition, İzmir International Fair, İzmir.
 2004  4th Solo Exhibition, “April Exhibition” Iktisatbank Gallery, Nicosia

References

External links 
 Brief biography

Turkish Cypriot artists
20th-century Turkish women artists
21st-century Turkish women artists
Cypriot artists
Cypriot painters
Cypriot educators
People from North Nicosia
Living people
1966 births
Gazi University alumni